1984 Empress's Cup Final was the 6th final of the Empress's Cup competition. The final was played at National Stadium in Tokyo on March 31, 1985. Shimizudaihachi SC won the championship.

Overview
Defending champion Shimizudaihachi SC won their 5th title, by defeating Takatsuki FC 4–0. Shimizudaihachi SC won the title for 5 years in a row.

Match details

See also
1984 Empress's Cup

References

Empress's Cup
1984 in Japanese women's football